Reedsville is an unincorporated community in eastern Olive Township, Meigs County, Ohio, United States.  It has a post office with the ZIP code 45772.

It lies along the Ohio River, below Hockingport and above Long Bottom.

Education
Public education in the community of Reedsville is provided by the Eastern Local School District. Campuses serving the community include Eastern Elementary School (Grades K-8) and Eastern High School  (Grades 9-12).

Reedsville has a public library, a branch of the Meigs County District Public Library.

Notable people
 Herma Briffault (1898-1981), ghostwriter and translator

References

Unincorporated communities in Meigs County, Ohio
Ohio populated places on the Ohio River
Unincorporated communities in Ohio